Joseph Gryzik (born October 10, 1927 in Katowice, Poland-23 April 2019) was a U.S. soccer halfback who spent his entire career with the Chicago Eagles of the National Soccer League of Chicago.  He is a member of the National Soccer Hall of Fame.

Gryzik emigrated to the United States in 1949, settling in Chicago, Illinois.  When he arrived, he joined the Polish American Athletic Club of the National Soccer League of Chicago.  In 1950, the team was renamed the Chicago Eagles.  Gryzik and his team mates won five Peel Cup titles (1950, 1954, 1955, 1957 and 1963).  Gryzik holds the Peel Cup single game scoring record with eight goals.  In 1955, the Eagles went to the National Amateur Cup finals where they fell to the Pittsburgh Heidelberg Tornados.  Gryzik retired in 1965, having spent his entire career with the Eagles, after suffering a career-ending injury.

Gryzik was a member of the U.S. soccer team at the 1963 Pan American Games.  He was also selected to the U.S. team which did not qualify for the 1964 Summer Olympics.

References

External links
 National Soccer Hall of Fame

1927 births
2019 deaths
Sportspeople from Katowice
Polish footballers
A.A.C. Eagles players
American soccer players
National Soccer League (Chicago) players
National Soccer Hall of Fame members
Soccer players from Chicago
Polish emigrants to the United States
Association football midfielders
Pan American Games competitors for the United States
Footballers at the 1963 Pan American Games